Clara Peters (born 19 July 1991) is an Irish figure skater. She is the first figure skater to represent Ireland in ISU competition.

Personal life 
Peters was born in Germany because her parents were working there at the time. She moved to Ireland when she was 18 months old and was raised in Dublin.

Career 
Peters began skating in Dublin around the age of seven. After her rink closed in 2000, she travelled two and a half hours to one in Belfast, Northern Ireland. In January 2006, Peters moved to Florida to be coached by Kerry Leitch. After Leitch retired in 2008, she moved to Delaware to train with Ronald Ludington and his wife Karen. The Republic of Ireland has no permanent rink.

Peters initially competed in domestic events in Great Britain, placing ninth at the 2007 British novice championships. She began competing internationally for Ireland beginning in the 2008–09 season, when Ireland became a provisional member of the International Skating Union.

Peters placed 38th at the 2009 European Championships. At the event, she became the first skater to represent Ireland at an ISU Championships. Peters placed 52nd at the 2009 World Championships, and 47th at the 2010 World Championships. She improved to 27th at the 2011 Europeans, but did not advance beyond the preliminary round at the 2011 World Championships. In 2012, Peters finished 28th at her fourth Europeans and improved significantly upon her past results by coming in 29th at Worlds; Peters stated that qualifying for the short program was "a huge deal" and meant that all her hard work had paid off.

Programs

Results 
JGP: Junior Grand Prix

References

External links

 
 Clara Peters at Tracings.net
 Documentary: At the top of my game

Irish figure skaters
Irish emigrants to the United States
1991 births
Living people
Sportspeople from Dublin (city)